Mehmet Tansu Okandan (17 July 1942 - 5 January 2019) was a Turkish diplomat.

He graduated from Ankara University Faculty of Political Sciences in 1965. After the dissolution of the Soviet Union, he served as Turkey's first ambassador to Belarus between 1992-1998. He served as Turkey's ambassador to Australia between 2001-2006.

Apart from his ambassadorial duties, he served as the general director of bilateral political affairs at the Ministry of Foreign Affairs between 1998-2001.

References 

1942 births
2019 deaths
Diplomats from Istanbul
Ambassadors of Turkey to Belarus
Ambassadors of Turkey to Australia
Ankara University Faculty of Political Sciences alumni